Katrina Johnston-Zimmerman is an American urban anthropologist. She co-founded The Women Led Cities Initiative. She was named to 2019 100 Women (BBC).

Life 
She graduated from Arizona State University, and Portland State University.

She studies human behavior in public space. She is an lecturer at Drexel University. She is guest lecturer at the KTH Royal Institute of Technology. She led a Women Led Cities Initiative project for Philadelphia.

Her work appeared in Next City, and op-ed appeared in The Philadelphia Inquirer.

References

External links 
 THINK.urban

Living people
American women anthropologists
Year of birth missing (living people)
Arizona State University alumni
Portland State University alumni
Drexel University people
21st-century American women
BBC 100 Women